Astragalus ochreatus is a species of milkvetch in the family Fabaceae. It is found in the North Khorasan province of Iran in Sarigol National Park.

References

ochreatus
Taxa named by Alexander von Bunge